Kim Hyung-sung (born 12 May 1980) is a South Korean professional golfer.

Kim has played on the Japan Golf Tour since 2009. He won his first tour event in 2012 at the Vana H Cup KBC Augusta.

Professional wins (7)

Japan Golf Tour wins (4)

Japan Golf Tour playoff record (1–0)

Korean Tour wins (3)
2006 SBS LIG KPGA Championship
2008 SBS Tomato Savings Bank Open, SBS Ace Savings Bank Montvert Open

Results in major championships

CUT = missed the half-way cut
"T" = tied

Results in World Golf Championships

"T" = Tied

Team appearances
this list may be incomplete
World Cup (representing South Korea): 2011
Royal Trophy (representing Asia): 2013
EurAsia Cup (representing Asia): 2014

References

External links

South Korean male golfers
Japan Golf Tour golfers
1980 births
Living people